The Boléro, Op. 19, is a short piano work written by Frédéric Chopin in 1833 and published in 1834. It is one of his lesser-known piano pieces, although it has been recorded numerous times.

Structure 
The overall key of the Boléro is difficult to establish. It was often listed as Boléro in C major - A minor, as the work opens with three unison octaves in G (dominant chords of C major) in fortissimo, then a lengthy introduction in C major, moving to A minor (the relative minor of C major) for the Boléro proper. This is interrupted by sections in A major, A-flat major and B-flat minor before returning to A minor. It ends triumphantly in A major (parallel major of A minor).

Composition 
The work was dedicated to the Scottish-born but half-French Mademoiselle la Comtesse Émilie de Flahaut, then aged only 14, and a pupil of Chopin's.  She was later to become Countess of Shelburne. The apparent inspiration for the Boléro was Chopin's friendship with the French soprano Pauline Viardot, whose father, the famed Spanish tenor Manuel García, had introduced boleros to Paris by the time of Chopin's arrival there.  His biographer Frederick Niecks speculated that it was inspired by the Bolero in Daniel Auber's La muette de Portici (1828). Despite the ostensibly Spanish flavour of the piece, it has been described as a polonaise in disguise, or a boléro à la polonaise, as its rhythms are more redolent of the national dance of Chopin's homeland than anything Spanish. It was written five years before Chopin first visited Spain in 1838.

References

External links 
Free score at IMSLP/Petrucci Music Library

1833 compositions
Compositions by Frédéric Chopin
Compositions for solo piano